Nenteriidae is a family of mites in the order Mesostigmata.

Genera
 Austrodinychus Trägårdh, 1952      
 Dobrogensisnenteria W. Hirschmann, 1985      
 Longitrichanenteria W. Hirschmann, 1985      
 Nenteria Oudemans, 1915      
 Perstructuranenteria W. Hirschmann, 1985      
 Ruehmnenteria Hirschmann, 1979      
 Stammernenteria Hirschmann, 1979      
 Unguisnenteria W. Hirschmann, 1985

References

Mesostigmata
Acari families